Daidō Club may refer to:
Daidō Club (1889–90)
Daidō Club (1905–10)